Molly O is a 1921 American silent comedy film starring Mabel Normand and directed by F. Richard Jones.

Cast
Mabel Normand as Molly O'
George Nichols as Tim O'Dair
Anna Dodge	as Mrs. Tim O'Dair (as Anna Hernandez)
Albert Hackett as Billy O'Dair
Eddie Gribbon as Jim Smith
Jack Mulhall as Dr. John S. Bryant
Lowell Sherman as Fred Manchester
Jacqueline Logan as Miriam Manchesteer
Ben Deeley as Albert Faulkner
Gloria Davenport as Mrs. James W. Robbins
Carl Stockdale as The Silhouette Man
Eugenie Besserer as Antonia Bacigalupi
Al Cooke as Man in Balcony at Charity Ball (uncredited)
Floy Guinn as Minor Role (uncredited)
Irene as Minor Role (uncredited)
Mildred June as Minor Role (uncredited)
Kathryn McGuire as Minor Role (uncredited)
John B. O'Brien as Minor Role (uncredited)
John J. Richardson as Man at Social Gathering (uncredited)
Peggy Rompers as Minor Role (uncredited)
Ben Turpin as Minor Role (uncredited)

See also
List of rediscovered films

External links 

Progressive Silent Film List: Molly O' at silentera.com

Molly O available for free download at Internet Archive

1921 films
1920s English-language films
American silent feature films
Films directed by F. Richard Jones
1921 comedy films
Silent American comedy films
First National Pictures films
American black-and-white films
1920s rediscovered films
Rediscovered American films
1920s American films